Sinan Idrizi (born 20 July 1968) is a key figure and major shareholder of Air Albania and is also the president of Albanian football club Flamurtari FC. He first started business at 1993 trading good from Turkey. In 2014 he became the president of Flamurtari FC. From his start, won the Albanian Cup. In 2018 he became the Shareholder of Air Albania.

Early life
Idrizi was born in Vlorë to a Cham father and a Lab mother. He studied at the Faculty of Geology and Mining at the Polytechnic University of Tirana in the late 1980s. Idrizi started his first businesses between 1993 and 1994, importing goods from Turkey.

References

1968 births
Living people
20th-century Albanian people
21st-century Albanian people
Albanian businesspeople